Tywyn Hospital is a health facility in Tywyn, Gwynedd, Wales. It is managed by the Betsi Cadwaladr University Health Board.

History
The foundation stone for the hospital was laid by Dame Margaret Lloyd George in August 1920. The hospital, which was intended to commemorate local soldiers who had died in the First World War, opened in August 1922. A maternity unit was added in 1932 and, after it joined the National Health Service in 1948, a continuing care ward was opened by the Duke of Edinburgh in 1973. An expansion involving an additional 16-bed ward and a new primary care centre was completed in 2016.

References

Hospitals in Gwynedd
Hospitals established in 1922
1922 establishments in Wales
Hospital buildings completed in 1922
NHS hospitals in Wales
Betsi Cadwaladr University Health Board